Gavin Mitchell may refer to:

Gavin Mitchell (actor) (born 1966), Scottish actor
Gavin Mitchell (footballer) (born 1972), former Australian rules footballer
Gavin Mitchell (Friends), a character from NBC sitcom Friends